Fancy Free is a Canadian music variety television program which aired on CBC Television in 1960.

Premise
Alan Miller hosted this successor to the CBC series Swing Gently. Episodes of this series were themed after a particular year and accompanied by costumes, film segments and music which represented that time. Regular performers included Allan Blye, the Rudy Toth orchestra, The Billy Van Four and Ruth Walker. Visiting artists included Orson Bean (American comedian/actor), Pam Hyatt (comedian), Doug Romaine (singer) and Señor Wences (ventriloquist). Some episodes featured dance troupe The Canadettes.

Scheduling
The half-hour program aired on Thursdays at 9:00 p.m. (Eastern) from 6 October to 29 December 1960.

References

External links
 

1960 Canadian television series debuts
1960 Canadian television series endings
CBC Television original programming
1960s Canadian variety television series